Barbara Hammond (26 July 1943 – 9 November 2009) was a British equestrian. She competed in two events at the 1988 Summer Olympics.

References

External links
 

1943 births
2009 deaths
British female equestrians
British dressage riders
Olympic equestrians of Great Britain
Equestrians at the 1988 Summer Olympics
People from Aughton, Lancashire